The main valleys of the Alps, orographically by drainage basin.

Rhine basin (North Sea)

High Rhine
Aare 
Limmat
Linth (Glarus)
Lake Walen
Seeztal
Klöntal
Sernftal
Reuss
Lake Lucerne
Sarner Aa (Brünig Pass connects to the Aare basin)
Muota
Schächental, Klausen Pass connects to Glarus
Urseren
Susten Pass connects to the Gadmertal
Furka Pass connects to the Goms
Saane/Sarine
Sense
Gürbetal
Lake Thun, Bernese Oberland
Kander
Simmental
Diemtigental (Chirel, Fildrich (Narebach, Senggibach, Gurbsbach))
 Suldtal
 Kiental
 Engstligental
Kandertal
, Habkern
Brienzersee, Interlaken
Lütschine
Saxettal
Schwarze Lütschine, Lütschental, Grindelwald, Grosse Scheidegg connects to Reichenbachtal
Weisse Lütschine, Lauterbrunnental, Lauterbrunnen
Sefinental
Giessbach
Haslital, Meiringen 
Reichenbachtal (Rychenbach, Seilibach), Grosse Scheidegg connects to Schwarze Lütschine
Gadmertal (Gadmerwasser, Triftwasser), Susten Pass connects to the Reuss 
Ürbachtal
Rindertal (Ärlenbach), Bächliltal (Bächlisbach)
Grimsel Pass connects to the Goms and the Furka Pass
Tösstal
Toggenburg (Thur)
Rhine Valley (Alpine Rhine)
Ill
Meng
Tamina
Prättigau  (Landquart)
Schanfigg (Plessur)
posterior Rhine
Albula
Landwasser (Davos)
Oberhalbstein (Julier Pass connects to the Inn basin)
Albulatal, Bergün, Preda (Albula Pass connects to the Inn basin)
Averstal
Splügen Pass connects to the Mera basin, San Bernardino Pass to the Moesa basin
anterior Rhine
Safien valley
Lumnezia (Glogn)
Vals Valley
Surselva (Oberalppass connects to the Reuss basin, Lukmanier Pass to the Leventina)

Danube basin (Black Sea)
Danube
Sava
Planica (Julian Alps)
Drava
Dravinja
Gail (river)
Meža
Gurk (river)
Mura
Inn
Ötztal
Zillertal
Engadin

Mediterranean

Rhone basin

Rhône
Durance
Verdon
Drôme
Isère
Arc
Drac
Fier
Arve
Chablais
Valais 
Dranse
Val de Banse
Val d'Entremont
Val d'Hérens, Val d'Herémece
Val d'Anniviers
Turtmanntal
Lötschental
Vispa
Saastal
Mattertal
Zmuttal
Goms (Nufenen Pass to the Leventina, Grimsel Pass to the Haslital, Furka Pass to the Reuss)
Binntal

Other
Roya
Var
Verdon

Adriatic

Po basin
Po
Mincio
Oglio (Lake Iseo)
Val Camonica
Adda (river) (Lake Como)
Breggia
Val Bregaglia (Mera)
Valle Spluga (Liro (stream - SO))
Val Brembana
Valsassina (Pioverna)
Valtellina 
Lambro
Ticino
Val Mesolcina
Valle Maggia
Valle Verzasca
Toce
Agogna 
Tanaro
Sesia
Aosta Valley (Dora Baltea)
Toce
Orco
Stura di Lanzo 
Dora Riparia 
Maira
Varaita
Pellice

Other
Adige
Val Müstair
Vinschgau
Etschtal

See also
Geography of the Alps
Principal passes of the Alps
Orography
List of rivers of Switzerland
List of highest paved roads in Europe
List of mountain passes

External links

 
Alps valleys
Alps